Charlevy Mabiala (born 31 March 1996) is a Congolese professional footballer who last played for Auxerre as a midfielder. Mabiala is a youth product of the Congolese club ACNFF.

International career
Mabiala represented the Congo U17s at the 2011 African U-17 Championship and the 2011 FIFA U-17 World Cup. He made his debut for the senior Congo national football team for the 2014 African Nations Championship.

References

External links

1996 births
Living people
Republic of the Congo footballers
Republic of the Congo international footballers
Association football midfielders
AJ Auxerre players
Ligue 2 players
2014 African Nations Championship players
Republic of the Congo A' international footballers
2015 Africa Cup of Nations players
ACNFF players
Republic of the Congo youth international footballers
Republic of the Congo expatriate sportspeople in France
Expatriate footballers in France